Altagène (Corsican: Altaghjè pronounced [al.ta.ˈɟe]) is a commune in the Corse-du-Sud department in the Corsica region of France.

Geography
Altagène is located some 20 km north-east of Propriano and some 25 km north-west of Porto-Vecchio in a direct line. Access to the commune is by road D49 running north from Sainte-Lucie-de-Tallano and ending in the village. The D320 also runs north from Sainte-Lucie-de-Tallano through the western part of the commune and continues to Zoza as road D20. There are some small mountain roads through the commune which is steeply sloped and heavily forested.

There are no identifiable rivers or streams nor other hamlets in the commune.

Neighbouring communes and villages

Administration

List of Successive Mayors of Altagène

Demography
In 2017 the commune had 49 inhabitants.

Culture and heritage

Civil heritage
The commune has a number of buildings and structures that are registered as historical monuments:
A House (12) (now the Town Hall) (18th century)
A House (13) (1779)
A House (15) (18th century)
A House (17) (1804)
A House (18) (1817)
A House (20) (18th century)
A House (21) (19th century)
A House (22) (1727)
A House (4) (1855)
Houses (17th - 20th centuries)

Religious heritage

The Parish Church of Saint Pantaléon (19th century) is registered as an historical monument.

The Church contains many items that are registered as historical objects:

The Furniture in the Church
An Altar Statue (19th century)
A Processional Banner (2) (19th century)
A Processional Banner (1) (19th century)
A Body Purse, Chasuble, Stole, Maniple, and Humeral Veil (19th century)
A Sunburst Monstrance (19th century)
A Ciborium (19th century)
A Chalice with Paten (19th century)
A Statue: Christ on the Cross (19th century)
A Statue: Saint Pantaléon (19th century)
A Statue: Virgin and Child (19th century)
A Statue: Saint Blaise (19th century)
A Painting: Apparition of the Virgin to Saint Blaise and Saint Pantaléon (18th century)

Altagène Photo Gallery

See also
 Communes of the Corse-du-Sud department

References

External links

Altagène on Géoportail, National Geographic Institute (IGN) website 

Communes of Corse-du-Sud